Children's fantasy is children's literature with fantasy elements: fantasy intended for young readers. It may also mean fantasy read by children, regardless of the intended audience.

The genre has roots in folk tales such as Aesop's Fables that were not originally intended for children: before the Victorian era, fairytales were perceived as immoral and ill-suited for children's minds. A market for children's fantasy was established in Britain in the 19th century, leading to works such as Lewis Carroll's Alice in Wonderland and Edith Nesbit's Five Children series; the genre also developed in America, exemplified by L. Frank Baum's The Wonderful Wizard of Oz. Of the authors of this period, Nesbit is commonly cited as the creator of modern children's fantasy. 

The golden age of children's fantasy, in scholars' view, occurred in the mid-20th century when the genre was influenced by J. R. R. Tolkien's The Hobbit and C. S. Lewis's The Chronicles of Narnia. In the vein of Narnia, the post-war period  saw rising stakes and manifestations of evil in the works of Susan Cooper and Alan Garner. Tolkien's Middle-earth led to mythopoeic fantasy in the 1970s, from authors such as Ursula K. Le Guin and Robin McKinley. Another influential writer of this period was Diana Wynne Jones, who wrote both medievalist and realist fantasies. 

In the late 1990s, J. K. Rowling's Harry Potter led to a commercial boom in the genre, reviving older authors' careers and spawning many imitators. A concurrent success is Philip Pullman's His Dark Materials, a darker, realistic fantasy that led to a corresponding trend in a new young adult market.

Children's fantasy books and series 

The protagonists are usually children or teens who have unique abilities, gifts, possessions or even allies that allow them to face powerful adversaries. Harry Potter is a powerful young wizard, one of the children of The Dark Is Rising series is an immature Old One with magical abilities, and in the His Dark Materials series the children have magical items and animal allies.  The plot frequently incorporates a bildungsroman. 

In the earlier part of the 20th century, C. S. Lewis noted that fantasy was more accepted in juvenile literature, and therefore a writer interested in fantasy often wrote in it to find an audience.

Forerunners 
 E. T. A. Hoffmann: The Nutcracker and the Mouse King
 Charles Kingsley: The Water-Babies
 George MacDonald: The Princess and the Goblin, The Light Princess, At the Back of the North Wind
 Lewis Carroll: Alice's Adventures in Wonderland, Through the Looking-glass
 Carlo Collodi: The Adventures of Pinocchio
 Kenneth Grahame: The Reluctant Dragon

1900 to 1945 
 L. Frank Baum: The Wonderful Wizard of Oz and its many sequels
 Beatrix Potter: The Tale of Peter Rabbit and rest of The 23 Tales
 Kenneth Grahame: The Wind in the Willows
 J.M. Barrie: Peter Pan; or, the Boy Who Wouldn't Grow Up
 E. Nesbit: Five Children and It, The Phoenix and the Carpet, The Story of the Amulet, The Enchanted Castle, The Magic City
 Rudyard Kipling: Puck of Pook's Hill and Rewards and Fairies
 Selma Lagerlöf: The Wonderful Adventures of Nils
 A. A. Milne: Winnie-the-Pooh, The House at Pooh Corner
 Zofia Kossak-Szczucka: The Troubles of a Gnome
 Erich Kästner: The 35th of May, or Conrad's Ride to the South Seas
 P. L. Travers: Mary Poppins series
 J. R. R. Tolkien: The Hobbit
 Antoine de Saint-Exupéry: The Little Prince
 Mary Norton: The Magic Bed Knob, Bonfires and Broomsticks

Post-War and 1950s 
 Jan Brzechwa: Pan Kleks trilogy
 C. S. Lewis: The Chronicles of Narnia
 Astrid Lindgren: Pippi Longstocking series, Mio, My Son, Karlsson-on-the-Roof series
 Robert A. Heinlein: the Heinlein juveniles, a set of 12 books that includes Starship Troopers
 T. H. White, The Sword in the Stone and Mistress Masham's Repose
 Tove Jansson: the Moomin series
 Mary Norton: The Borrowers series

Late 20th Century 
 Maurice Sendak: Where the Wild Things Are
 Astrid Lindgren: Ronia, the Robber's Daughter, The Brothers Lionheart
 Michael Ende: Momo, The Neverending Story
 Susan Cooper: The Dark Is Rising
 Roald Dahl: Charlie and the Chocolate Factory, James and the Giant Peach, Matilda, The BFG and others
 Diana Wynne Jones: The Lives of Christopher Chant, Charmed Life
 Alan Garner: The Weirdstone of Brisingamen, The Owl Service
 Andre Norton: the Witch World series
 Ursula K. Le Guin: A Wizard of Earthsea and its sequels
 Jill Murphy: The Worst Witch series
 Brian Jacques: the Redwall series
 Anne McCaffrey: the Dragonriders of Pern Harper Hall trilogy
 Madeleine L'Engle: the Time Quartet
 Lloyd Alexander: The Chronicles of Prydain
 Chris Van Allsburg: The Garden of Abdul Gasazi, Jumanji and Zathura, The Polar Express
 Dorota Terakowska: Lustro pana Grymsa (The Mirror of mister Gryms), Babci Brygidy szalona podróż po Krakowie (Grandma Brygida’s Mad Journey through Cracow), Władca Lewawu (The Ruler of Lewaw), Córka czarownic (Witches' Daughter), W krainie Kota (In The Land of the Cat), Samotność Bogów (The Loneliness of the Gods), Tam gdzie spadają anioły (Where the Angels Fall)

More recent titles and series 
 James Gurney: Dinotopia series
 Philip Pullman: His Dark Materials, Clockwork and The Firework-Maker's Daughter
 J. K. Rowling: Harry Potter
 Holly Black and Tony DiTerlizzi: The Spiderwick Chronicles
 Cornelia Funke: The Thief Lord, Inkheart series, Dragon Rider 
 Mary Pope Osborne: The Magic Tree House series
 Tamora Pierce: The Song of the Lioness, Circle of Magic, and sequels
Jonathan Stroud: Bartimaeus Sequence and Lockwood & Co.
 Rick Riordan: Camp Half-Blood Chronicles, The Kane Chronicles, and Magnus Chase and the Gods of Asgard
 Christopher Paolini: Eragon
 Angie Sage: Septimus Heap
 Erin Hunter: Warriors, Seekers, and Survivors series
Brandon Mull: Fablehaven, Beyonders, and Five Kingdoms series
 Jennifer A. Nielsen: The False Prince trilogy
 Chris Colfer: The Land of Stories
 Tui T. Sutherland: Wings of Fire series
Shannon Hale: The Goose Girl and sequels, Princess Academy

References

Sources

Further reading

 
 
 
 

Fantasy genres
Fantasy